The Passaic County Court House complex is located at the seat of Passaic County, New Jersey in Paterson.

Old Passaic County Courthouse and Annex

The Old Passaic County Court House and Annex are located at 71 and 63-65 Hamilton Street, respectively.
 The Passaic County Court House was constructed between 1898 and 1903. It was designed by architect Samuel Burrage Reed and is an excellent example of Classical Revival architecture. The Court House Annex was constructed in 1899 as the United States Post Office following a design of architect Fred Wesley Wentworth in the Dutch Baroque Revival style. The county acquired the building in 1936 and the building was re-dedicated as the Passaic County Administration Building and annexed to the adjacent county court house.

In October 2012, the  buildings were determined to be eligible for the state and federal registers of historic places. The New Jersey State historic preservation office made a grant of $20,000 to prepare nominations for listing. The main entrance of the old courthouse which had fallen into disrepair was restored, reopening in 2014. They were listed in 2015.

Passaic County Court House and Administration Building

The Passaic County Court House is located at 77 Hamilton Street, was constructed in 1968. to house the courts and administration of the county

The new adjacent Passaic County Administration Building, built in 1994, is located at 401 Grand Street.

See also

List of tallest buildings in Paterson
Paterson City Hall
List of United States federal courthouses in New Jersey
County courthouses in New Jersey
Richard J. Hughes Justice Complex
List of New Jersey county seats
National Register of Historic Places listings in Passaic County, New Jersey

References 

Buildings and structures in Paterson, New Jersey
Government buildings completed in 1898
Government buildings completed in 1968
County courthouses in New Jersey
Beaux-Arts architecture in New Jersey
Tourist attractions in Passaic County, New Jersey
Fred Wesley Wentworth buildings
Buildings and structures in Passaic County, New Jersey
Courthouses on the National Register of Historic Places in New Jersey